The Man Inside may refer to:
 The Man Inside (1916 film), an American silent film directed by John Adolfi
 The Man Inside (1958 film), based on the M. E. Chaber novel
 The Man Inside (1990 film)
 The Man Inside (2012 film), by Dan Turner, starring David Harewood
 The Man Inside (novel) 1968, by W. Watts Biggers
 The Man Inside, 1954 novel by M. E. Chaber
 "Man Inside", an episode of the television series The Shield

See also
Inside Man (disambiguation)